Tetraphenylene is an organic compound, solid at room temperature, with the chemical formula C24H16. It is a member of the unsaturated polycyclic hydrocarbons class of compounds and a tetramer of benzyne.

See also 
 Cyclooctatetraene

References 

Polycyclic aromatic hydrocarbons